Andrea Casandra Alfaro is an American-New Zealand aquaculture and marine ecology academic. She is currently a full professor at the Auckland University of Technology.

Academic career

After a 2001 PhD at the University of Auckland titled  'Ecological dynamics of the green-lipped mussel, Perna canaliculus, at Ninety Mile Beach, northern New Zealand,'  Alfaro moved to Auckland University of Technology, rising to full professor. Much of her research is related to the Perna canaliculus New Zealand green-lipped mussel, an important species in New Zealand aquaculture industry, but she has projects throughout the Pacific, including many with students from the Fiji National University.

Business career 
Alfaro is also a director of Bluff Ltd, a company reestablishing pāua farming in Bluff. She also provides the company with scientific advice.

Selected works 
 Alfaro, Andrea C., François Thomas, Luce Sergent, and Mark Duxbury. "Identification of trophic interactions within an estuarine food web (northern New Zealand) using fatty acid biomarkers and stable isotopes." Estuarine, Coastal and Shelf Science 70, no. 1-2 (2006): 271–286.
 Alfaro, Andrea C. "Benthic macro-invertebrate community composition within a mangrove/seagrass estuary in northern New Zealand." Estuarine, Coastal and Shelf Science 66, no. 1-2 (2006): 97–110.
 Alfaro, Andrea C., Andrew G. Jeffs, and Robert G. Creese. "Bottom-drifting algal/mussel spat associations along a sandy coastal region in northern New Zealand." Aquaculture 241, no. 1-4 (2004): 269–290.
 Campbell, Kathleen A., Campbell S. Nelson, Andrea C. Alfaro, Sheree Boyd, Jens Greinert, Stephanie Nyman, Emmanuelle Grosjean et al. "Geological imprint of methane seepage on the seabed and biota of the convergent Hikurangi Margin, New Zealand: Box core and grab carbonate results." Marine Geology 272, no. 1-4 (2010): 285–306.

References

External links
  
 Professor Andrea C. Alfaro at Auckland University of Technology

Living people
Year of birth missing (living people)
New Zealand women academics
New Zealand marine biologists
University of Auckland alumni
Academic staff of the Auckland University of Technology
21st-century New Zealand women writers